Grinder may refer to:

Machinery
Various types of grinding machine, used in a machining operation to refine the surface of materials
Food grinders
Blade grinder, includes food processors, blenders, electric coffee and spice grinders, etc.
Coffee grinder, a machine used for grinding coffee
Herb grinder, a grinder used for herbs including marijuana
Meat grinder, a machine used for grinding food
Wet grinder, a grinder that uses water either to soften the product ground or to keep the grinding elements cool
Grinder winch, a device for tensioning a rope to control a sail on a boat

People
Grinder (surname)
Bob Baker (boxer) (1926–2002), American heavyweight boxer nicknamed "The Grinder"
Michael Mizrachi (born 1981), American professional poker player nicknamed "The Grinder"
Cliff Thorburn (born 1948), Canadian retired professional snooker player, nicknamed "The Grinder"

Places
Grinder, Norway, a village in Grue Municipality in Innlandet county, Norway
Grinder Island, Marshall Archipelago, Antarctica
Grinder Rock, Palmer Archipelago, Antarctica
Grinder's Stand, Tennessee, the tavern whose cabin inn Meriweather Lewis died in, in October 1809

Brands or products
Grinder sandwich, a regional name for a submarine sandwich
Grinders (footwear), a footwear brand

Arts and entertainment

Games
 The Grinder (video game), an unreleased video game
 Młynek (Nine Men's Morris), a board game also known as Grinder

Music
 Grinder (band), a German speed/thrash band from the late 80s and early 90s
 Organ grinder, the operator of a street organ
 "Grinder" (song), 1980s Judas Priest song

Television
 The Grinder (TV series), a 2015 American sitcom
 Grinder (biohacking community), also known as a biohacker, designer and installer of DIY body enhancements

Sports
 Grinder (hockey), an ice hockey player whose primary function is checking opponents
 Grinder (sailing position), a specific role in yachting, whose primary role is to use winches to control the sails

Ships
 , several ships of the Royal Navy

See also
Grindor (Transformers)
Grider (disambiguation)
Grinde (disambiguation)
Grindr, a gay dating app

Lists of people by nickname